Gymnastics competitions at the 2015 European Games were held in the National Gymnastics Arena, Baku between 15–21 June 2015.

In all, five different gymnastics disciplines were contested. In addition to the existing Olympic programme, additional events were held in both the rhythmic gymnastics and trampolining disciplines. In addition, events in two non-Olympic disciplines, aerobic gymnastics and acrobatic gymnastics were included.

Qualification

A total of 425 athletes qualified for the gymnastics competitions. Qualification was based on the results from the World or European Championships in each discipline.

Medal summary

Acrobatic

Women's groups

Mixed pairs

Aerobic

Artistic gymnastics

Men's events

Women's events

Rhythmic gymnastics

Individual

Group

Trampoline

Medal table

References

External links
Results Book – Gymnastics Acrobatic
Results Book – Gymnastics Aerobic
Results Book – Gymnastics Artistic
Results Book – Gymnastics Rhythmic
Results Book – Gymnastics Trampoline

 
Sports at the 2015 European Games
European Games
2015